Bledius filipes is a species of beetle belonging to the family Staphylinidae.

It is native to Europe.

References

Staphylinidae